Ell-Cranell is the trade name of two hair loss treatments in Germany:

 Ell-Cranell alpha (alfatradiol)
 Ell-Cranell dexa (alfatradiol and dexamethasone)